"You're Driving Me Out of My Mind" is a song by the Little River Band. It was released in 1983 as the second single from their album The Net.

The song is the band's final top 40 hit, peaking at No. 35 on the Billboard Hot 100.

Chart performance

References

1983 singles
1983 songs
Little River Band songs
Songs written by Graeham Goble
Capitol Records singles